Abu Zakariya  Yahya ibn Mu'adh al-Razi (830–871 CE) was a Muslim Sufi who taught in Central Asia. One of the first to teach Sufism in masajid, he left a number of books and sayings. Despite his emphasis on raja, the hope for Jannah and for Allah's forgiveness, he was renowned for his perseverance in worship and his great scrupulousness in matters of religion. A disciple of Ibn Karram, he left his native town of Rey and resided for a time in Balkh, afterwards proceeding to Nishapur where he died in 871 at the age of forty one.

References

830 births
871 deaths
People from Ray, Iran
Sufi teachers
Iranian Sufis